Madhura Audio is a music company in India. It owns a music label Madhura Audio. Madhura Audio  has its presence in Tollywood, the Telugu film industry. It is headquartered at Hyderabad, India. Madhura Audio is the record label preferred by most filmmakers in Tollywood and they eventually became a household name in the film industry of Andhra Pradesh and Telangana.

Overview
Madhura Audio was established by Madhura Sreedhar Reddy who now serves as Managing Director of the company. Madhura Audio was primarily into distribution and marketing of music of other music labels for the state of Andhra Pradesh. Later they started acquiring their own music rights.

Madhura Audio owns Music rights for some of films in Tollywood.

Filmography

Telugu

Eerojullo Romantic Crime Story (2013)
Mallela Theeram Lo Sirimalle Puvvu (2013)
Ko Antey Koti (2012)
Pranayam (2013)
Chinna Cinema (2013)
Priyathama Neevachata Kushalama (2013)
Fire
Life (2013)
Anthaka Mundu Aa Tarvatha (2013)
Kiss (2013)
Love Life (2013)
Waiting For You (2013)
Welcome Obama (2013)
Mondodu (2014)
Nayana (2013)
Music Magic (2013)
Bunny n Cherry (2013)
First Love (2013)
Jananam (2013)
Man of The Match (2013)
Prema Ishq Kaadhal (2013)
Hrudhayam Ekkadunnadi (2013)
Brundavanamulo 24 Gantalu
Madhumati (2013)
Missed Call (2013)
Ide Charutho Dating (2013)
Basanti (2014)
Nakaithe Nachindi (2015)
Tanu Nenu Mohammad Rafi (2015)
Kothaga Rekkalochena (2016)
Prabhanjanam (2014)
Hang Up (2014)
Ninnu Chusi Vennele Anukunna (2014)
Hrudaya Kaleyam (2014)
Pelladandi Premenchaka Mathrame (2014)
Lover Boy Clover Ammayi (2014)
Aarya Chitra (2014)
Maine Pyar Kiya (2014)
Weekend Love (2014)
Vatapatra Sai 
Ladies & Gentlemen (2015 film) (2015)
Maaya (2014 film) (2014)
Tolisandya Velalo
A Shyam Gopal Varma Film (2015)
Om Mangalam Mangalam (2014)
Kavvintha (2016)
Jilla (2014)
Trivikraman (2016)
Hora Hori (2013)
Cinema Choopistha Mava (2015)
O Sthree Repu Raa (2016)
Ramasakkani Rakumarudu (2016)
Sankarabharanam
Veeri Veeri Gummadi Pandu (2015)
Ameerpet Lo (2015)
Kalyana Vaibhogame (2016)
Premante Suluvu Kadura (2016)
Maunanga (2015)
Bommala Ramaaram (2016)
Love Cheyala Vadda (2016)
Coach No.9 (2016)
Muddapappu Avakai (2016)
Anustaanam (2016)
Oka Manasu (2016)
Nayaki (2016)
Aithe 2.0 (2015)
Aranyamlo (2016)
Atu Itu Kani Hrudayam Thoti (2016)
Pelli Choopulu (2016)
Kadhanam (2016)
Raagam(2004)
ABCD: American Born Confused Desi(2019)
Dorasaani(2019)
George Reddy (2019)

Devotional Albums
  Padana Telugu Patta
  Devia Swaranajali
  Bhajana Sudhajhari
  Nirmala Tattwalu
  Swami Vivekananda
  Sri Krishna Ganamrutham
  MAHAVEERA BAJARANGBALI
  Swamy Sannidhanam
  Sri Sai Sthotranjali
  Ganapriya
  Navamrutha Tattva Geethika
  Jyothirmayi Gazals
  Om Sai Namo Namaha
  Swararaagamaalika
  Nee Apaaramaina Prema
  Nibandhana Rakthamu
  Dayadakshinya Poorunda
  Omkareswarudu
  Sai Geetanjali
  Sai Gaananjali
  Naa Pranadharamu
  Sai Smaranam
  Raaganjali
  Nithyuda
  Sharanam Shabareesha

References

http://indtoday.com/madhura-sreedhar-to-produce-kcrs-biopic/
http://www.rediff.com/movies/slide-show/slide-show-1-south-madhura-sreedhar-reddy/20111108.htm

http://www.tfpc.in/sensational-song-neeve-on-madhura-audio/

External links

 Madhura Audio On Youtube

Mass media companies of India
Music companies of India
Companies based in Hyderabad, India
Indian record labels
Indian music record labels
Year of establishment missing